Niemenmäki is a quarter of the Munkkiniemi neighbourhood in Helsinki. Niemenmäki was constructed in the early 1960s. The nearby Shopping center provides everyday services to Niemenmäki inhabitants. Huopalahdentie road separates Niemenmäki from Munkkivuori in the West and Lapinmäentie road from Haaga in the North. Allotment gardens separate Niemenmäki both from Pikku Huopalahti in the East and from Vanha Munkkiniemi in the South.

External links 

Munkkiniemi